The 1988 Masters (officially the 1988 Benson & Hedges Masters) was a professional non-ranking snooker tournament that took place between 24 and 31 January 1988 at the Wembley Conference Centre in London, England. The players ranked inside the top 16 took part in the competition.

Defending champion, Dennis Taylor, lost in the first round against Mike Hallett, who had made his debut. Steve Davis won his second Masters title by defeating Hallett 9 frames to 0. This is the only time a whitewash had occurred in a Masters final.

Field
Defending champion Dennis Taylor was the number 1 seed with World Champion Steve Davis seeded 2. The remaining places were allocated to players based on the world rankings. Mike Hallett and John Parrott were making their debuts in the Masters.

Main draw

Final

Century breaks
Total: 2
 126  Steve Davis
 105  John Parrott

References 

Masters (snooker)
Masters
Masters Snooker
Masters, the